Ericka Yadira Cruz Escalante (born November 16, 1981, in Mérida) is a Mexican beauty pageant titleholder who represented her country in the Miss Universe 2002, held in Puerto Rico. She was the first woman of predominantly African heritage to represent Mexico in Miss Universe.

References

1981 births
Living people
Miss Universe 2002 contestants
Nuestra Belleza México winners
People from Mérida, Yucatán